The Excelsior Stakes is an American Thoroughbred horse race held annually during the first week of April at Aqueduct Racetrack in Ozone Park, Queens, New York. A Listed event for three-year-olds and up, it is contested over a distance of one-and-one-eighth miles 9 furlong.

"Excelsior" is Latin for "Upward, ever upward", and is the motto of the state of New York.

In 1928, when Hall of Famer Grey Lag was ten years old, he came in third. He'd won this race as a five-year-old in 1923.

The race was run at the old Jamaica Race Course from 1903 to 1910, and then again from 1915 to 1959.  In 1913, it was run at Belmont Park.  It wasn't run at all in 1909, 1911, 1912, 1914, 1933, 1967, and 2020.

Since inception, the race has been contested at various distances and as initially a handicap as the race was known as the Excelsior Handicap:
  miles : 1903–1960
 1 mile : 1960
 1 mile, 1 furlong : 1961–1978
  miles : 1994–2014, 2018-2019, 2021
  miles : 1979–1993, 2015–2017

The event was downgraded from Grade III to Listed in 2022.

Records
Speed record: (at distance of  miles)
 1:48.10 – Classic Endeavor (2003)
 1:48.10 – Magna Graduate (2007)

Most wins:
 2 – King Saxon (1935, 1936)
 2 – Find (1954, 1956)
 2 – Lac Ouimet (1987, 1988)
Most wins by a trainer:

 3 –Todd Pletcher (2006, 2007, 2019)
 3 –William C. Winfrey (1953, 1954, 1956)

Most wins by a jockey:
 3 – Eric Guerin (1953, 1954, 1956)
 3 – Ángel Cordero Jr. (1972, 1975, 1976)
 3 – Bobby Ussery (1958, 1962, 1966)
 3 – Chuck C. Lopez (1997, 2003, 2008)

Most wins by an owner:
 3 – Rancocas Stable (1923, 1929, 1931)
 3 – Alfred G. Vanderbilt II (1953, 1954, 1956)
 3 – Sigmund & Viola Sommer (1972, 1977, 1980)

Winners

 † In 1905 Preen finished first but was disqualified.

References

Open mile category horse races
Horse races in New York City
Recurring sporting events established in 1903
Aqueduct Racetrack
Jamaica Race Course
1903 establishments in New York City